The canton of Saint-Gély-du-Fesc is an administrative division of the Hérault department, southern France. It was created at the French canton reorganisation which came into effect in March 2015. Its seat is in Saint-Gély-du-Fesc.

Composition

It consists of the following communes:
 
Assas
Buzignargues
Cazevieille
Combaillaux
Guzargues
Les Matelles
Murles
Prades-le-Lez
Saint-Bauzille-de-Montmel
Saint-Clément-de-Rivière
Sainte-Croix-de-Quintillargues
Saint-Gély-du-Fesc
Saint-Hilaire-de-Beauvoir
Saint-Jean-de-Cornies
Saint-Jean-de-Cuculles
Saint-Mathieu-de-Tréviers
Saint-Vincent-de-Barbeyrargues
Teyran
Le Triadou
Vailhauquès

Councillors

Pictures of the canton

References

Cantons of Hérault